Several ships of the Royal Navy have been named HMS Pursuer.

  – an escort carrier of the Second World War, built in 1942 as SS Mormacland transferred to the Royal Navy under Lend-Lease, returned to the US Navy in 1946 to be scrapped.
  – a tank landing ship, originally launched as LST 3504 in 1944, and renamed in 1947. Transferred to the Ministry of Transport in 1956 and renamed Empire Tern. She was broken up in 1969.
  – an Archer-class fast patrol boat, launched in 1986 and completed in 1988.

Battle honours
 Atlantic 1943–45
 Norway 1944
 Normandy 1944
 South France 1944
 Aegean 1944

Royal Navy ship names